Congregation Beth Jacob may refer to:

Congregation Beth Jacob (Atlanta), Atlanta, Georgia
Congregation Beth Jacob (Galveston, Texas)